The 2022 presidential campaign of Isko Moreno began on September 22, 2021, when Isko Moreno announced his intention to run for the presidency in the 2022 Philippine presidential election. Isko Moreno has served as the mayor of Manila, the country's capital city, from June 30, 2019 to June 30, 2022.

Moreno ran on a platform highlighting his track record in Manila and promising to replicate his 3-year achievements as first-termed mayor on a national scale. His economic platform covers health, housing, education, infrastructure, tourism, agriculture, livelihood, digital transformation, good governance, and "smart governance". He also vowed to lower utility expenses and continue certain policies of then incumbent President Rodrigo Duterte such as infrastructure development and the campaign against illegal drugs while maintaining adherence to human rights.

Moreno lost the election by a wide margin, ultimately placing fourth out of ten candidates with 1,933,909 votes. Moreno later conceded to then presumptive president-elect Bongbong Marcos a day after the election. Had Moreno been elected, he would have been the second president from Manila and the third mayor to run for the presidency and win. His campaign has been observed to have been affected by his lack of political machinery, minimal media coverage, and insufficient counter to overwhelming disinformation against him.

Background

Francisco Moreno Domagoso, more popularly known as Isko Moreno, started his career in the entertainment industry. Born and raised in the slums of Tondo, Manila, Isko Moreno first gained popularity as a cast member of the variety show That's Entertainment during the 1990s. In 1998, he entered politics at age 23 when he was elected as councilor, the youngest elected councilor in Manila's history at the time, for the 1st district of Manila and served for three consecutive terms. In 2007, he ran and was elected vice mayor of Manila under former mayor Alfredo Lim from 2007 to 2013 and Joseph Estrada from 2013 to 2016. He ran for a Senate seat in 2016 but was defeated. He returned to the political limelight in 2019 following his election as mayor of Manila, defeating Joseph Estrada, the then-incumbent mayor. Moreno is the youngest elected vice mayor and mayor in the history of Manila.

Campaign

Announcement 

Isko Moreno was reportedly to take his oath as a member of Aksyon Demokratiko, the party founded by Senator Raul Roco, in September 2021. This was after he resigned from the National Unity Party. However, this did not happen as an unexpectedly large number of people turned up on vaccination sites, particularly in Manila. Moreno was subsequently elected party president a week later. He later announced his presidential bid on September 22 with Dr. Willie Ong as his running mate. They filed their certificates of candidacy (COCs) on October 4.

According to Ong in an interview with Boy Abunda in April 2022, there was a supposed backdoor "unity talk" among Moreno, incumbent Vice President Leni Robredo and other aspirants before the filing of candidacy. The initial plan was for these camps to form a united front to avoid vote splitting against former senator Bongbong Marcos who also hinted to run for presidency, but the scheduled meeting did not push through. Moreno's camp initially believed that they came to an agreement with Robredo that Moreno would be the opposition standard bearer with Robredo supporting his bid. However, Robredo also announced her candidacy weeks later after Moreno's announcement, much to Moreno's surprise. Initially a frontrunner, Moreno's numbers in opinion polls noticeably dwindled following Robredo's announcement.

Moreno had expressed intention to retire in politics should he fail to get elected as president and would rather spend quality time with his family.

Official candidacy names as listed on the official ballot from the Commission on Elections
 #3. DOMAGOSO, ISKO MORENO
 #6. ONG, DOC WILLIE

Key officials 
Lito Banayo, who previously served as the campaign managers of presidents Benigno Aquino III and Rodrigo Duterte during their respective presidential bids, was appointed as Moreno's campaign manager. Former Bases Conversion and Development Authority chairperson Vince Dizon was also initially reported to be part of Moreno's campaign team as deputy campaign manager, although this was later denied by Dizon. On October 13, 2022, it was announced that Moreno's long-time aide and chief of staff Cesar Chavez, a former Department of Transportation undersecretary and known ally of political bigwigs, amicably resigned from his post after he was offered a promotion from his previous job at DZRH and due to health concerns despite rumors of "infighting" between Banayo's team and Moreno's long-time supporters including Chavez. It was alleged that ever since Banayo's team came in, he and his team eased out Chavez and other long-time supporters in key meetings that led to Chavez resigning. However, the rumor was later denied by Chavez himself.

Running mate 

According to Banayo, Grace Poe was their first choice as Moreno's running mate but Poe refused to run against Tito Sotto whom she has close familial ties with. Willie Ong, a cardiologist and media personality with large following, would later be selected as Moreno's running mate. Ong left Lakas–CMD a day later after his announcement to run for vice president. He joined Moreno's political party, Aksyon Demokratiko, on September 25.

Branding 
 
Moreno's main campaign colors are white and blue. The campaign's supporters adopted the moniker Iskonians and Iskolars, a wordplay on the word "scholars".

Moreno also popularized the hand gesture "2 joints" wherein one has to place one's thumb, forefinger, and middle finger together while the rest of the fingers are up in the air. In youth culture, the hand gesture is associated with cannabis smoking. Moreno however defended that the hand gestures were meant to indicate the letters "Y" and "O", which stands for "Yorme" (means "mayor" in Tagalog street slang, as well as Moreno's moniker) and "Ong", respectively, signifying his partnership with Willie Ong. The gesture originated when a young adult shouted the words "2 joints" and flashed the hand gesture at Moreno during one of their campaign sorties in Mindanao, to which Moreno responded by flashing back the gesture. The video of Moreno flashing the hand gesture became viral and popular, thus, the gesture was later used in his campaigns. The song Ganon Paren To by hip-hop artist Bugoy na Koykoy, who first popularized the term "2 joints" in the Philippines, was later used in Moreno's campaign rallies after securing permission.

Other songs used in Moreno's rallies include the modified version of the song Posible sung by Jimmy Antiporda (originally composed by Rico Blanco), Sige Lang by Quest, (Dying Inside) To Hold You by Timmy Thomas, and the songs Nais Ko by Smugglaz and Bassilyo, Ang Nais Ko'y Ikaw by Jimmy Bondoc, and Isigaw Mo, Isko by hip-hop artist YoungOne featuring Mickrophone, which were made specifically for the campaign. Supporters of Moreno also use the "God first" sign wherein the index finger is pointing upwards, a hand gesture associated with Moreno's Asenso Manileño local party.

Moreno described his campaign as populist and centrist, emphasizing his rags-to-riches story. He positioned himself as an "alternative candidate", portraying survey frontrunners Bongbong Marcos and Leni Robredo as embodiments of elitist politics that has excluded alternative candidates like him. Moreno capitalized on his 23 years in public service and track record as mayor as a response to critics saying he is "in a rush to be president". He further asserted that the issues in the country should be addressed "in a rush" as well in order to adapt to fast-changing times and that being young can be an advantage for the presidency, especially in the time of crisis where fast-moving developments call for energetic and quick leadership. Moreno also prided himself as the only candidate who acts and gets things done swiftly, citing his universally-acclaimed accomplishments as mayor in just three years time on his first term. He considered himself as an "underdog" in the presidential race against the Marcos and Robredo camps who he called as political giants who have been dominating the political landscape in the country for years.

Rallies 

On October 24, 2021, Moreno's supporters held a "blue wave caravan," which was joined by about 1,000 motorcycle riders and 100 vehicles. On November 15, 2021, Moreno held another motorcade in Metro Manila and Cebu. Organizers estimated about 5,000 motorcycle riders and 500 cars joined the event in Metro Manila and 500 participants in Cebu. Moreno's official campaign website was later launched on November 25, 2021, during a virtual meet-and-greet.

On February 8, 2022, Isko Moreno held his proclamation rally at the Kartilya ng Katipunan in Manila. He was joined by his running mate Ong and Aksyon's senatorial slate.

On February 20, 2022, Moreno started his campaign in Mindanao, beginning in the region of Bangsamoro. Campaign events in the region notably featured local officials pushing for a Moreno and Sara Duterte (ISSA) tandem. As a result, Ong was absent from the campaign activities, a decision that was made by their campaign manager Banayo stating that it might be "embarrassing" for Ong to go there due to the support for Duterte. Moreno's camp distanced themselves from the purported tandem, affirming their support for Ong.

Moreno is the first candidate to meet with Bangsamoro Chief Minister Murad Ebrahim who welcomed him as an "incoming president" during a courtesy call As a result, this was reported as a sign that Ebrahim has endorsed Moreno's campaign. Ebrahim's party and the Moro Islamic Liberation Front later clarified that the Bangsamoro regional government has yet to formally endorse any candidate and that the "warm welcome" for Moreno was not tantamount to an endorsement. Ebrahim eventually endorsed Leni Robredo and Sara Duterte as president and vice president respectively.

Polling

Moreno had maintained his standing as the "top second choice" of voters based on surveys conducted by pollsters Pulse Asia, OCTA Research, and Manila Bulletin–Tangere months before the election.

Senatorial slate
Moreno and Ong have endorsed the following candidates for the 2022 Philippine Senate election, thus who are part of their "senatorial slate" dubbed as the Team Bilis Kilos:

Noli de Castro, a former senator and vice president himself, was originally running for senator under Aksyon Demokratiko.  However, he withdrew from the race just five days after filing his certificate of candidacy citing undisclosed personal reasons. He was replaced by Jopet Sison.

Moreno also expressed interest to include then incumbent President Rodrigo Duterte in his slate had he decided to pursue his initial intention to run for senator, despite of the two having a fall out months prior to the filing of candidacy.

Endorsements

Platform
10-Point Economic Agenda:
Housing
Education
Labor and employment
Health
Tourism and the creative industry
Infrastructures
Digital transformation and industry 4.0
Agriculture
Good governance
Smart governance

Political positions

Abortion and contraception 
Moreno is categorically opposed to abortion, reiterating his belief in the "sanctity of life". However, he is open for the government to provide other interventions that would help rape victims "move forward with their lives without harming their child". He is also open to the existing legality of "therapeutic abortion" in the country for medical necessity. Nevertheless, Moreno is in favor for people to freely choose whatever contraception and family planning method they prefer that can be offered by the state.

Age of criminal liability 
Moreno is against the lowering of the age of criminal liability from age 15 to age 9.

Capital punishment 
Moreno is against the reinstatement of the death penalty describing it as "cruel" as it affects wrongly-sentenced prisoners.

Divorce 
Moreno said he approves the legalization of divorce in the Philippines.

Economy 
Moreno supports the idea on giving financial assistance to micro, small, and medium enterprises (MSMEs), including 0% interest on loans in financial institutions. Moreno is an advocate of using advanced technology in the agriculture sector. Moreno proposes to create a Department of National Culture and History in the executive branch. He also supports countryside development by constructing a "tourism circuit" and is in favor of digital transformation. Moreno is also in favor of ending contractualization but wants the government to increase employment rate first by generating as many jobs as possible before considering such action.

Education 
Moreno is in favor of amending the educational curriculum in the country by developing tech-voc and agriculture courses in basic education, as well as enhancing the science, technology, engineering, and mathematics curriculum. Moreno is also in favor of enhancing early childhood education and development, as well as improving the accessibility to the internet of students and teachers.

Environment 
Moreno advocates sustainable reforestation in denuded forests by involving indigenous peoples. Moreno is also in favor of responsible mining.

Fake news 
Moreno is in favor of legally penalizing social media sites promoting fake news, disinformation, and misinformation, reiterating his stance as "non-negotiable".

Ferdinand Marcos 
Moreno has said that he admired former President Ferdinand E. Marcos Sr. "at some point", specifically for being a "visionary" and for his infrastructure projects, but condemns his links to corruption and human rights abuses. He also believes that abusers during martial law should be made accountable, and stands firm that martial law must not happen again. Moreno also supports the annual commemoration of the People Power Revolution.

Foreign policy 
Moreno expressed strong opinions on a foreign policy aligned with what he calls a "Filipino-first" policy, envisioning that the Philippines will forge contracts, organizations, and even trade agreements, for that matter, if it is only beneficial to Filipinos.

Moreno agrees that the Philippines is not "militarily prepared" for an encounter with China, and that order must be upheld such as the Law of the Sea. He believes that the country's defense secretary should come from the navy, since the Philippines is an archipelagic country. On the issue of the country's claim to the West Philippine Sea occupied by Chinese forces, he believes that the Philippines' approach should be "fearless" in asserting the claim and should be responsive to the plight of Filipino fishermen, while at the same time should be "fair" and "sensible" in dealing with other countries also occupying the South China Sea, especially in trade. Moreno has criticized the United Nations (UN), questioning what they are doing in light of China's disregard of the Permanent Court of Arbitration (PCA). Moreno asserted that China needs to accept a 2016 arbitration award of the Hague ruling that made clear the Philippines' entitlements, including where it can fish and exploit offshore oil and gas, also citing the Velarde map as reference. However, he also expressed opinion in forming partnerships with other countries as well as to prepare in terms of joint trade with China.

Moreno expressed support of the Philippines returning to the International Criminal Court (ICC) if the move would "give a good impression to the world".

Freedom of Information 
Moreno is in favor that all government officials should be open to disclosing their Statement of Assets, Liabilities, and Net Worth (SALN), including "their properties, belongings and their debts", being a public document. He also believes that the policy on Freedom of Information should be strengthened.

Health 
Moreno expressed the idea to invest in local human resources such as doctors and scientists to make locally-made medicines, even a vaccine, in addressing the COVID-19 pandemic in the Philippines. Moreno supports boosting vaccinations and establishing additional specialty hospitals in each of all 17 administrative regions. He also advocates for the establishment of the Cancer Center of the Philippines aiming to provide free medicines and medical procedures to indigents. Moreno is against the legalization of medical marijuana stating that the "government should fix its system first" since it will be subject to abuse, but would reconsider if "further studies from science will prove that marijuana is a more effective treatment than other medicines." Moreno supports the vaping bill and the regulation of electronic cigarettes to provide smokers with alternatives to traditional cigarettes. Moreno is also in favor of promoting and strengthening policies in mental health. Additionally, Moreno believes that PhilHealth will be better managed by financial experts. He also supports increasing wages and benefits of healthcare workers.

Infrastructure 
Moreno has expressed support for the Build! Build! Build! infrastructure program of the current administration. He vows to continue the program and plans to impose a well-planned zoning by making the National Land Use Act a priority legislation. Moreno is in favor of implementing socialized housing programs nationwide.

LGBT issues 
Moreno opposes same-sex marriage but supports same-sex civil unions and LGBT rights.

Maritime 
Moreno spoke strongly on re-evaluating the current setup of the shipbuilding industry in the Philippines, criticizing it by saying that the brand new ships that are built overseas "enjoy tax incentives" but not the ships built by local shipbuilders which generate employment for the country.

OFW 
Moreno is in favor of entering bilateral labor agreement with other countries to ensure the welfare of both documented and undocumented Overseas Filipino Workers (OFW).

Party system 
Moreno pitched the need for the country to shift back to a two-party system for "smooth-sailing governance". Moreno also prefers the election of two senators per region for equal representation and expressed support for the continuation of the party-list representation system but emphasized that there should be safeguards to avoid abuse and manipulation, preferably regionalized to distance away from the idea of Imperial Manila. He also criticized that the party-list system is being used to exploit the poor and extend political dynasties.

Political dynasties 
Moreno bans family members to enter politics or any public office while he remains in a government office. He expressed that he is "not comfortable" with the existence of political dynasties and hoped to implement an anti-political dynasty law if he were to be elected president.

Political turncoatism 
Moreno is not against transferring from one political party to another whenever he sees fit. He has expressed that he does not mind being called a "political butterfly", stating he would rather leave a political party whenever the party loses public trust and if his political principles does not coincide with the party's anymore. He added that "a public servant's loyalty should not lie with a political party, but rather to the people".

Pornography 
Moreno is in favor of legally penalizing social media sites promoting pornography.

War on drugs 
Moreno expressed that he would continue the Duterte administration's flagship war on drugs but without extrajudicial killings linked to it.

Women's rights 
Moreno supports gender equality and women empowerment. He is vocal about providing equal opportunities to women, regardless of social status, sexual preference, religious beliefs or political affiliations. He is also an advocate of meritocracy and favors job promotions based on merits and credentials and not by political affiliations and gender as what he did in the Manila City Hall during his term as mayor. Moreno had also given his vice mayor Honey Lacuna, the first ever elected female vice mayor in the history of Manila, executive functions on a par with his mayoral duties.

References

External links

2022 Philippine general election